Hisashi Shinma (born March 22, 1935) is a Japanese booker and promoter. Shinma is noted for being an on-screen authority at the World Wrestling Federation, from 1978 to 1984, billed as the President of the promotion. He was succeeded by Jack Tunney.

Career
Shinma was chairman and one of the bookers for New Japan Pro-Wrestling at the time and negotiated a talent-sharing arrangement with the World Wrestling Federation within the junior heavyweight division, which ultimately launched Tatsumi Fujinami as an international superstar and an eventual successor to Antonio Inoki.

Shinma’s most famous moment as WWF President occurred on December 6, 1979, after Bob Backlund regained the WWF title from Antonio Inoki at the end of his Japan tour. Shinma overruled the decision due to interference from Tiger Jeet Singh. Inoki refused to accept the belt, but Backlund regained the vacant title after returning to the United States.  Backlund's title loss to Inoki is still not officially acknowledged by WWE and was kept hidden from American audiences until Pro Wrestling Illustrated recognized Inoki's reign in the late 1990s.

Shinma's other accomplishments included fitting Satoru Sayama with the Tiger Mask gimmick, discovering Akira Maeda, and forming the UWF in Japan after leaving New Japan. Shinma remained in UWF until disagreements arose with Sayama over the match content.

His son Hisatsune Shinma was also a promoter, and co-founded Universal Lucha Libre with Gran Hamada, one of the original UWF members, but with the promotion focus on the Lucha libre style brought from Mexico.

Championships and accomplishments
Tokyo Sports
Lifetime Achievement Award (1983)
Wrestling Observer Newsletter
Wrestling Observer Newsletter Hall of Fame (Class of 1996)
WWE
WWE Hall of Fame (Class of 2019)

References

External links

Professional wrestling authority figures
1935 births
Living people
WWE Hall of Fame Legacy inductees